John Killeen (1920 – June 2005) was an Irish hurler who played as a left wing-forward for the Galway senior team.

Playing career
Killeen made his first appearance for the team during the 1944 championship and was a regular member of the starting fifteen until his retirement a decade later after the 1954 championship. During that time he won a National Hurling League winners' medal.

At club level Duffy began his club career with Tynagh in Galway before later winning two county club championship medals with Clonad in Laois.

References

1920 births
2005 deaths
Tynagh hurlers
Clonad hurlers
Galway inter-county hurlers
Connacht inter-provincial hurlers